The United States House of Representatives elections in California, 1922 was an election for California's delegation to the United States House of Representatives, which occurred as part of the general election of the House of Representatives on November 7, 1922. The districts were not reapportioned after the 1920 Census (California would have gained three districts as a result of the 1920 Census), so the state's delegation remained at 11 representatives, and the partisan makeup remained unchanged, at 9 Republicans and 2 Democrats.

Overview

Results
Final results from the Clerk of the House of Representatives:

District 1

District 2

District 3

District 4

District 5

District 6

District 7

District 8

District 9

District 10

District 11

See also 
68th United States Congress
Political party strength in California
Political party strength in U.S. states
1922 United States House of Representatives elections

References 
California Elections Page
Office of the Clerk of the House of Representatives

External links 
California Legislative District Maps (1911-Present)
RAND California Election Returns: District Definitions

1922 California elections
1922
California United States House of Representatives